Hey Ma may refer to:

 Hey Ma (album), or the title song, by James, 2008
 "Hey Ma" (Cam'ron song), 2002
 "Hey Ma" (Pitbull and J Balvin song), 2017
 "Hey, Ma" (Bon Iver song), 2019
 "Hey Ma", a song by Chance The Rapper from 10 Day, 2012
 "Hey Ma", a song by Family of the Year from Loma Vista, 2012
 "Hey Ma", a song by The Furys, 1977
 "Hey Ma (Hide the Daughter)", a song by Little Jimmy Dickens, 1959

See also
 Hey Mama (disambiguation)
 "Hey Mami", a song by Sylvan Esso from the 2014 album Sylvan Esso